Nadezhda Aleksandrovna Talanova (born 17 April 1967, in Udmurtia) is a Russian biathlete. At the 1994 Winter Olympics in Lillehammer, she won a gold medal with the Russian relay team, which consisted of herself, Natalya Snytina, Luiza Noskova and Anfisa Reztsova.

References

1967 births
Living people
People from Udmurtia
Russian female biathletes
Olympic biathletes of Russia
Biathletes at the 1994 Winter Olympics
Olympic gold medalists for Russia
Olympic medalists in biathlon
Biathlon World Championships medalists
Medalists at the 1994 Winter Olympics
Sportspeople from Udmurtia